Great Parndon Abbey was a Premonstratensians abbey in Great Parndon, Essex, England.

References

Monasteries in Essex